Seize may refer to:
Seisin, legal possession
Seizing, a class of knots used to semi-permanently bind together two ropes
Seize (band), a British electronic band
The jamming of machine parts against each other, usually due to insufficient lubrication
Seize, a fictional town the anime TV series Sound of the Sky

See also
Confiscation
Detain
Impoundment (disambiguation)
Raptus
Seizure (disambiguation)
Sequester (disambiguation)
Usurper